Tickford Bridge, over the River Ouzel (or Lovat) in Newport Pagnell, Buckinghamshire, England, was built in 1810. It is one of the last (21 still remaining) cast iron bridge in Britain that still carries modern road traffic, and is the oldest bridge in the City of Milton Keynes. There is a plaque near the footbridge at the side that gives details of its history and construction. A large set of sluice gates, used to control downstream flooding of the River Great Ouse, is located near the bridge.

Tickford Bridge is Grade I listed by Historic England.

See also
The Iron Bridge

References

External links

Buildings and structures in Milton Keynes
Grade I listed bridges
Grade I listed buildings in Buckinghamshire
Bridges in Buckinghamshire